Do Shikaari (Two Warriors) is a 1979 Bollywood film directed by Kuljit Pal. The film stars Vinod Khanna and Rekha. Production for the film, originally named Anjana Safar, started in 1969, but ran into censorship problems.

Cast
Biswajeet as Ranjeet
Rekha as Sunita
Vinod Khanna as Satish 
Amjad Khan as Zorro 
Joginder as Joginder 
Alka as Sherry
Padma Khanna as Dancer

Plot

Seeking the treasure located in Solomon's Mines in the heart of Africa, Zorro (Amjad Khan) abducts and holds Sunita's (Rekha) father as ransom, and forces her to journey to Africa, to find the treasure. She does travel to Africa, and meets with Ranjeet (Biswajeet) and asks him for help to locate her missing brother. Ranjeet agrees to do so, and they commence their travel, little knowing what awaits them in the deep jungle full of wild beasts; hostile tribesmen; a seemingly endless and barren desert; not to speak of treachery and greed of people from their own group.

Soundtrack
All songs were composed by Chitragupt. 

"Chand Kyo Jard Hai" - Lata Mangeshkar
"Zindagi Ae Zindagi, Humse Mat Kar Dillagi" - Deedar Singh Pardesi
"Aa Ja Gori Dil Mein Rakh Len Tujhe" - Kishore Kumar
"Ae Dil Meri Jaan Teri Manzil Hai Kahan" - Deedar Singh Pardesi
"Bahar Bitne Wali Hai" - Deedar Singh Pardesi
"Honth Ye Mere Aag Se Nahi Kam" - Asha Bhosle
"Pagal Hawa Raate Diwani" - Asha Bhosle

External links
 

1979 films
1970s Hindi-language films
Films scored by Chitragupta